The Church of the Conception is a Neogothic Catholic church in Madrid, Spain.

It is located on Calle Goya at the corner of Calle de Núñez de Balboa, and its construction was carried out between 1912 and 1914. The architect in charge of the church's design was  until his death in 1910. Another architect, finished the work. The tower—with a height of — is topped with an iron spire, itself crowned by a sculpture of the Immaculate Conception. King Alfonso XIII of Spain and his consort Queen Victoria Eugenie attended the church's opening; the ceremony took place 11 May 1914. The building has undergone several renovations: in the 1950s, in 1985 and 2013.

On 8 July 1977 Boletín Oficial del Estado published a report requesting the church's declaration as Bien de Interés Cultural.

See also 
Catholic Church in Spain
List of oldest church buildings

References

Bibliography

External links

Roman Catholic churches in Madrid
Gothic Revival architecture in Madrid
20th-century Roman Catholic church buildings in Spain
Roman Catholic churches completed in 1914
Buildings and structures in Salamanca District, Madrid
Madrid
Gothic Revival church buildings in Spain